Chemla is a surname. Notable people with the surname include:

Joan Chemla (born 1984), French film director
Judith Chemla (born 1984), French actress
Karine Chemla (born 1957), French historian of mathematics and sinologist
Paul Chemla (born 1944), French bridge player
Lucette Valensi (born 1936), born Chemla